PM2FGR (106.6 FM), on-air name 106.6 V Radio, is a radio station in Jakarta, Indonesia. V Radio focused on 90s music, although 2000s and 2010s songs are also played in weekdays. MNC Networks owns this station.

History 
This radio started with DMC Radio branding until mid 1990s. Later, this radio rebranded as S Radio, focusing at celebrity news and infotainment format like 101.1 Showbiz Tsismis in Manila at that time. S Radio's music was similar with Prambors and CHR stations at the time. S Radio was mentioned in Jakarta Undercover 2 book, popular book that revealed Jakarta's nightlife at that time. In 2004, S Radio moved to 106.6 FM after years in 107.9 FM. 
Later in 2005, Muara Radio (previously on 90.4 FM) acquired this frequency with its dangdut music format. Muara Radio abandoned this format in 2010, rebranded into 106.6 M Radio (initial of Muara) with no dangdut music. In 2010, MNC Networks acquired the station to replace Women Radio (PM2FGF) that was leased to non-group owner.

V Radio Era 
At the first 6 years, V Radio focused on content for women, hence its tagline "The voice of inspiring woman". Some programs related to women and mothers were held, including talks and off-air activations. 
In 2017, V Radio changed its tagline as Lagu Hitsnya Beda due to playlist focus to 80s and 90s song, also started targeting men in its programming. V Radio was the first to reborn slow adult contemporary radio in Jakarta, after Delta FM's re-branding, followed by Kis FM. Unlike its rival Most Radio which played 80s, 90s with some rock, metal and Camajaya with some rock and roll, country, oldies, 00s and 60s-70s, V Radio focused on slow and relaxing music, also plays 2000s and 2010s music on the weekdays.

Facilities 
V Radio's office is in MNC Tower, Jl.Kebon Sirih No.17-19, Menteng, Central Jakarta. Its transmitter is possibly in Kebon Jeruk, West Jakarta, sharing the same site with RCTI transmitter. As the result, V Radio possibly has the highest HAAT in Jakarta. Although the transmitter is there, the radio is licensed in East Jakarta due to S Radio's office in that city.

Slogans

As DMC Radio Action
 Station For The Nation

As S Radio
 Jakarta Infotainment Station

As Muara FM
 Jakarta One Stop Dangdut Station

As V Radio
 The Voice Of Inspiring Women (2011-2016, 2022-)
 Lagu Hitsnya Beda (Song Hits Is Different) (2017-2022)

Jingles 
V Radio Using the Jingles from Reelworld since year 2011
 106,6 FM V Radio
 Women Inspiration, Family Entertainment, V Radio

References 

Radio stations in Jakarta
Media Nusantara Citra